Irving Azoff (born December 12, 1947) is an American entertainment executive and chairman of Full Stop Management, which represents recording artists. In the mid-1980s, he brought success to MCA Records.

Since September 2013, he has been chairman and CEO of Azoff MSG Entertainment, a venture with The Madison Square Garden Company. Prior to this he served as chairman and CEO of Ticketmaster Entertainment and was executive chairman of Live Nation Entertainment and CEO of Front Line Management. He is also on the board of Starz Inc. and IMG.

In 2012, he topped Billboards Power 100 and was named the most powerful person in the music industry.

Biography
Raised in a Jewish family in Danville, Illinois, Azoff began promoting and booking bands while a student at Danville High School and then in college at the University of Illinois at Urbana–Champaign. His first management client was Champaign-based REO Speedwagon; his second was Dan Fogelberg. In 1972, Azoff headed to Los Angeles with Fogelberg. He worked for Geffen-Roberts Management and there began working with the Eagles, a relationship that has lasted more than forty years. During his career he has worked as an agent, personal manager, concert promoter, movie producer, independent record label owner, merchandiser, music publisher, and CEO of a record company.

From 1983 to 1989, Azoff was chairman of MCA Music Entertainment Group and is credited for turning around that label's fortunes.

According to Thomas R. King's book The Operator (2001), David Geffen manipulated Azoff into leaving MCA and going to Warner Music Group, where Azoff started Giant Records. King writes that Geffen wanted Azoff out at MCA to clear the way for MCA to buy Geffen Records. Geffen convinced Mo Ostin at Warner Music to offer Irving Azoff a "dream" label deal. Giant Records operated for much of the 1990s until Azoff decided to return to concentrating on artist management.

Azoff co-produced the movies Fast Times at Ridgemont High, Urban Cowboy, Jack Frost, Above The Rim, and The Inkwell, and was executive producer of The Hurricane. He has been named "Manager of the Year" by two touring industry trade publications. In 2012, Azoff appeared in Artifact, a documentary film about the modern music business focused on the legal battle between Thirty Seconds to Mars and record label EMI.

In 2013, Azoff founded the performance rights organisation Global Music Rights.  The company administers publishing for artists including Metallica, Bruce Springsteen, John Lennon and George Harrison, Pearl Jam, and Bruno Mars.

In 2015, Azoff played a thinly veiled version of himself in the Documentary Now! parody of History of the Eagles.

In October 2008, ticketing and marketing company Ticketmaster announced they would acquire the management company Front Line Management Group, Inc. As part of the deal, Azoff, who was founder and chief executive officer of Front Line, became chief executive officer of Ticketmaster and was named chairman of Live Nation in February 2011.

In September 2013, Azoff unveiled Azoff MSG Entertainment''', a venture with The Madison Square Garden Company (MSG). In addition to his role as chairman and CEO of Azoff MSG Entertainment, Azoff would serve as a consultant to MSG in connection with the management of its live event venues, including the Forum in Inglewood, CA and other MSG-managed buildings.

In 2012, he topped Billboard'' Magazine's Power 100, being named the most powerful person in the music industry. Azoff serves on the boards of iHeartCommunications, Inc. and Starz LLC.

In 2015, Azoff co-founded Oak View Group along with Tim Leiweke. The company is building the Belmont Park Arena as well as a new arena in Milan, Italy.

In 2018, Azoff and Oliver Chastan co-founded Iconic Artists Group, an entertainment rights management company. In 2021, Iconic Artists Group acquired the catalogue of David Crosby and a majority stake in The Beach Boys' intellectual property.

In 2019, Azoff and his wife Shelli purchased The Apple Pan, one of Los Angeles' oldest continuing operating restaurants. They also purchased Nate n'Al's, founded in 1945, with a consortium of Los Angeles-based investors.

In January 2020, Azoff was inducted into the Rock and Roll Hall of Fame as an Ahmet Ertegun Award winner.

Controversy

Monopolization claims
In 2018, Radio Music License Committee made antitrust claims against Azoff's Global Music Rights, LLC, a performance rights organization. A settlement was reached in 2022.

Clippers Arena proposal
Controversy was generated when Azoff MSG Entertainment took part in a lawsuit against the city of Inglewood in an attempt to stop the construction of a new arena for the Los Angeles Clippers in Inglewood, alongside residents of the local neighborhood . During the summer of 2019, it was reported that Azoff was working with James L. Dolan of the Madison Square Garden Company to prevent the competing arena from being built similar to the tactics used to stop the construction of the proposed West Side Stadium in New York City in 2005. In March 2019, leaked emails revealed that Azoff attempted to lure the Los Angeles Lakers back to The Forum after their lease at the Staples Center was up.

Nicki Minaj
In 2018, Nicki Minaj accused Azoff of orchestrating a smear campaign against her upcoming tour.  He later became her manager. Additionally, his performance rights organization Global Music Rights manages most of her songwriting credits, in this role replacing BMI.

Labels founded by Azoff
 Full Moon Records
 Giant Records

References

External links
David Segal: Calling Almost Everyone's Tune
Irving Azoff on Twitter

1947 births
Living people
American music industry executives
20th-century American Jews
American music managers
MCA Records
People from Danville, Illinois
21st-century American Jews